Briar Bauman is an American Flat Track racer from the United States. Two time AFT Grand National Champion years 2019 and 2020. He achieved the second place at 2018 X Games Harley-Davidson Flat-Track and the third place at the AFT twins in 2018.

References

Year of birth missing (living people)
Living people
American motorcycle racers